Impress or Impression may refer to:

Arts
Big Impression, a British comedy sketch show
Impression, Sunrise, a painting by Claude Monet

Biology
Maternal impression, an obsolete scientific theory that explained the existence of birth defects and congenital disorders
IMPReSS, a database of standardized phenotyping protocols used by the International Mouse Phenotyping Consortium

Computing 
Impress, a presentation program included in StarOffice, there are four descendant office suites
 Apache OpenOffice Impress
 Collabora Online Impress
LibreOffice Impress
 NeoOffice Impress

Legal
Case of first impression, a case or controversy over an interpretation of law never before reported or decided by that court.
Present sense impression, in the law of evidence, is a statement made by a person that conveys their sense of the state of certain things at the time the person was perceiving the event, or immediately thereafter.

Printing 
Impression, a synonym for a print run in the publishing industry.
Impression seal, a type of accent seal.

Other uses 
 IMPRESS, Independent Monitor for the Press, a press regulator in the United Kingdom
Cost Per Impression, a term used in online marketing for measuring the worth and cost of a specific e-marketing campaign.
Impressment, the act of conscripting people to serve in the military or navy.

See also

First impression (disambiguation)